Yehouda Leon Chaki is a Greek-born Canadian artist based in Montreal, Quebec. Best known for his colourful palette and expressionistic landscapes, he began exhibiting in 1959 and today his work can be found in over 50 public and corporate collections and museums around the world such as Concordia University, the Montreal Museum of Fine Arts, Musée d'Art Contemporain de Montréal, Jerusalem City Hall, and the Museo de Arte Moderna in Rio de Janeiro.

Biography 

Yehouda Chaki was born in Athens, Greece on December 11, 1938. He is the son of Sephardic Jewish parents and his early childhood was marked by the Holocaust. Chaki and his parents spent five years secretly living in the home of a Christian family in Athens before they could safely relocate to Israel with his younger brother.

This event inspired many of his works including his 1968 painting which was hung at Concordia University titled "Express Train from Salonika to Auschwitz" depicting the transport of Jews to the concentration camps during the Holocaust  and the 1999 Mi Makir installation described in the book "Mi Makir: A Search for the Missing". This exhibit featured a wall filled with dark unframed portraits of Holocaust victims each bearing a number in the top left corner, and a large pile of books on the floor.

Chaki lived in Holon, near Tel Aviv, from 1945 to 1960. Throughout his adolescence, he studied painting, drawing and printmaking under Joseph Schwartzman and in his teens entered the Avni Institute of Art to study with Avigdor Stematsky, Moshe Mokady and Yehezchel Streichman. Following compulsory army service, he moved to Paris to complete his education at the Ecole Nationale Supérieure des Beaux-Arts while working for artist Yaacov Agam.

In Paris, Chaki met Montrealer Grace Aronoff who was a student at the Sorbonne. The couple married in Montreal, Canada in 1963. They have two children, Lisa, married to Alan Post and Adam Chaki, married to Lisa Noto.

Career 

Chaki exhibits regularly while continuing to work out of his studio in Montreal. In 1967, Chaki became head of Painting and Drawing in the Department of Fine Arts at the Saidye Bronfman Centre of Montreal until 1989.

Yehouda Chaki is currently represented by six major galleries including Galerie de Bellefeuille in Montreal, Odon Wagner Gallery in Toronto, Gallery Jones in Vancouver, Galerie St Laurent & Hill in Ottawa, Newzones in Calgary, and Melissa Morgan Fine Art in Palm Desert. Chaki has also worked on commissions by various patrons of the arts. In 1987 the Congregation Shaar Hashomayim commissioned Chaki to design a large tapestry in honour of the synagogue's 145th anniversary, in 1988 he painted "The Four Seasons" that is hanging at Place Ville-Marie for the Royal Bank of Canada, in 2000 Chaki designed the stained glass windows for the Adath Israel Congregation of Montreal, and in 2001 Salvatore Guerrera commissioned another work in stained glass for Concordia University. Chaki is also known for having created the bronze statue presented to the winners of Canada's premier fiction award, the Giller Prize, from 1994 to 2004.

Over the years his work has been reviewed in art journals such as ARTnews and Vie des Arts and supported by eminent art critics such as J. Russell Harper in "Chaki: Recent Paintings" published by Galerie Dresdnere in 1982. Chaki is also the subject of the book "Chaki: A Language of Passion," published by Buschlen Mowatt Fine Arts in 1994 with essays by Barrie Mowatt, Leo Rosshandler and Herbert Aronoff. In 2017, Yehouda Chaki was featured on Federation CJA's website celebrating the Jews who played a major role in Quebec history, culture, and society.

Selected collections 
Chaki's works are in many Canadian public collections such as the Montreal Museum of Fine Arts and the Musée d'art contemporain de Montréal and abroad in museums such as the Museo de Arte Moderna in Rio de Janeiro, as well as in numerous corporate and private collections.

Exhibitions 

Chaki has had over 100 solo exhibitions since 1962.

Group exhibitions 

Chaki has participated in over 450 group exhibitions in galleries across North and South America, Europe and the Middle East.

External links

References 

1938 births
Artists from Montreal
Greek emigrants to Mandatory Palestine
Living people
Greek Sephardi Jews
Greek painters
Greek emigrants to Canada
Canadian painters
Jewish Canadian artists
Canadian alumni of the École des Beaux-Arts
Artists from Athens
Jews and Judaism in Montreal